Robert Paul (born June 2, 1937) is a Canadian former pair skater. He teamed up with Barbara Wagner in 1952. They became the 1960 Olympic champions, four-time World champions, and five-time Canadian national champions. After retiring from competition, the pair toured with Ice Capades.

Paul choreographed for Peggy Fleming, Dorothy Hamill, Linda Fratianne, and Donny and Marie. He was one of Mirai Nagasu's coaches. He appeared in the Bewitched episode "Samantha on Thin Ice".

Results
(with Wagner)

References 

Canadian male pair skaters
1937 births
Living people
Lou Marsh Trophy winners
Olympic figure skaters of Canada
Olympic gold medalists for Canada
Figure skaters at the 1956 Winter Olympics
Figure skaters at the 1960 Winter Olympics
Figure skating choreographers
Figure skaters from Toronto
Olympic medalists in figure skating
World Figure Skating Championships medalists
Medalists at the 1960 Winter Olympics
20th-century Canadian people
21st-century Canadian people